Ikaw Lang ang Mamahalin (International title: Only You / ) is a Philippine television drama romance series broadcast by GMA Network. The series is a remake of the 2001 Philippine television series of the same title. Directed by Roderick Lindayag, it stars Barbie Forteza, Joshua Dionisio, Kristofer Martin and Joyce Ching. It premiered on October 10, 2011 on the network's Afternoon Prime line up replacing Sinner or Saint. The series concluded on February 10, 2012 with a total of 90 episodes. It was replaced by The Good Daughter in its timeslot.

The series is streaming online on YouTube.

Premise
Mylene and Clarissa are cousins and best friends. When a landslide strikes their community, Mylene suffers from amnesia. Clarissa later ends up in a slum area and grows up under the care of a family of crooks. While Mylene lives as Katherine, with the woman who saved her from the landslide. Clarissa meets Ferdinand, and mistakes her for being his missing daughter for she is wearing the necklace that Mylene gave to her. Seeing this as an opportunity to live a comfortable life, Clarissa pretends to be Mylene.

Cast and characters

Lead cast
 Barbie Forteza as Katherine Morales / Mylene Avelino Fuentebella
 Joshua Dionisio as Charles Ballesteros
 Kristofer Martin as Jepoy Dimaculangan
 Joyce Ching as Clarissa Delos Angeles / Clarissa Fuentebella

Supporting cast
 Gardo Versoza as Ferdinand Fuentebella
 Sheryl Cruz as Amara Luna
 Tanya Garcia as Lilian Avelino-Fuentebella
 Ehra Madrigal as Katrina
 Matet de Leon as Ising Somera
 Ernie Garcia as Badong
 Maricar de Mesa as Helena
 Karla Estrada as Loida
 Shirley Fuentes as Raquel
 Victor Aliwalas as Rommel
 Ella Cruz as Britney
 Carmen Soriano as Corazon
 Joko Diaz as Berto
 Kier Legaspi as Joel
 Teejay Marquez as Victor
 Cara Eriguel as Josie
 Chunggay Riego as Mayordoma
 Tess Bomb as Tessie

Guest cast
 Sarah Lahbati as young Amara
 Bianca King as young Katrina 
 Diva Montelaba as young Lilian
 Elmo Magalona as young Ferdinand
 Julia Joan Chua as young Clarissa
 Gianna Cutler as young Mylene

Ratings
According to AGB Nielsen Philippines' Mega Manila household television ratings, the pilot episode of Ikaw Lang ang Mamahalin earned a 15.9% rating. While the final episode scored a 22.2% rating.

Accolades

References

External links
 
 

2011 Philippine television series debuts
2012 Philippine television series endings
Filipino-language television shows
GMA Network drama series
Philippine romance television series
Television series reboots
Television shows set in the Philippines